Michi Atkins from Loraine, Texas was a professional basketball player in the WNBA. She was drafted by the Charlotte Sting in the 1997 WNBA elite draft. She also played professionally in Israel. She left Texas Tech as the Southwestern Athletic Conference (SWC) all-time leader in points scored with 2,134. She was named the SWC female athlete of the year and conference MVP after both her junior and senior seasons.

See also
List of Texas Tech Lady Raiders in the WNBA Draft

References

Living people
All-American college women's basketball players
American women's basketball players
Basketball players from Texas
People from Loraine, Texas
Texas Tech Lady Raiders basketball players
1973 births